Njunis is a mountain in the interior of southern Troms og Finnmark county, Norway. The mountain lies in Målselv Municipality. The tree line (downy birch) reaches to  elevation on the southern slope of the mountain, the highest tree line in Troms. This forest is part of the Øvre Dividal National Park. At the peak, NATO has a radar centre.

Name
The name is from the word in the Northern Sami language njunis which means "prominent nose of a mountain".

See also
 List of mountains in Norway by prominence

References

Målselv
Mountains of Troms og Finnmark